The Primera División de México Apertura 2008 Liguilla (Spanish for "little league") will have the teams play two games against each other on a home-and-away basis. The winner of each match up will be determined by aggregate score. the higher seeded team will advance if the aggregate is a tie. The exception for tie-breaking procedure is the finals, where the higher seeded team rule will not be used. If the teams remained tied after 90 minutes of play during the 2nd leg of the finals, extra time will be used, followed by a penalty shootout if necessary. The teams will be seeded 1 to 8 (depending on their position at the end of the regular season). Higher seeded teams play on their home field during the second leg.

Kickoffs are given in local time.

Bracket

Quarter-finals
The quarterfinals are scheduled to be played on November 22, 23, 29, and November 30.

|}

First leg

Second leg

Santos Laguna won 5–2 on aggregate.

Atlante won 2–2 on aggregate.

Toluca won 2–0 on aggregate

Cruz Azul won 3-1 on aggregate.

Semi-finals
The semifinals are scheduled to be played on December 3, 4, 6, and 7.

|}

First leg

Second leg

Cruz Azul won 4–2 on aggregate.

Toluca won 2–1 on aggregate.

Final

The first and second legs of the final are scheduled to be played on December 11 and 14, respectively.

First leg

Second leg

References

Aper